"Salamat" ("Thank you") is a song released by the Filipino rock band the Dawn in 1989. It was the lead single on their third album Beyond the Bend. It was written by Teddy Diaz, JB Leonor, Jett Pangan and Carlos Balcells. In its instrumental break, the guitar solo was played by Diaz.

Erwin Castillo calls it "an inspired collaboration among The Dawn, our writer Bonnie Melocoton, and our producers." The song's original music video features their new Japanese guitarist Atsushi Matsuura.

David Gonzales of AllMusic commented: "It starts with a mysterious-sounding chord progression played on keyboards; a fiery guitar line explodes and the song becomes a fast-paced, tuneful outing, punctuated by spirited keyboard and guitar lines. The song also contains an interlude where a searing guitar solo is played over hard-edged guitar chords."

It was re-recorded by the Dawn in 2001 for their first album since 1994, Prodigal Sun.

Personnel
Teddy Diaz - electric and lead guitar
JB Leonor - drums
Jett Pangan - vocals
Carlos Balcells - bass

References

1989 songs
1989 singles
The Dawn (band) songs
Songs about friendship
Tagalog-language songs